Academy Charter High School is a four-year charter public high school located in Lake Como, in Monmouth County, New Jersey, United States, that operates independently of the local school district under the terms of a charter granted by the Commissioner of the New Jersey Department of Education. The school serves residents of Allenhurst, Asbury Park, Neptune, Avon-by-the-Sea, Belmar, Bradley Beach, Deal, Interlaken and Lake Como. Students are accepted at the school on a lottery basis with seats in the incoming freshman class allocated in proportion to the population of each of the participating municipalities and any remaining unfilled seats are then offered to residents of other communities.

Academy Charter High School opened in September 1998. Maximum enrollment authorized by the state is 220 students.

As of the 2021–22 school year, the school had an enrollment of 172 students and 18.0 classroom teachers (on an FTE basis), for a student–teacher ratio of 9.6:1. There were 98 students (57.0% of enrollment) eligible for free lunch and 13 (7.6% of students) eligible for reduced-cost lunch.

Athletics
The Academy Charter High School Panthers play independently of any conference in play under the auspices of the New Jersey State Interscholastic Athletic Association (NJSIAA). With 126 students in grades 10–12, the school was classified by the NJSIAA for the 2019–20 school year as Group I for most athletic competition purposes, which included schools with an enrollment of 75 to 476 students in that grade range.

The 2008 boys' basketball team won the Central, Group I state sectional championship with a 62–55 win over Asbury Park High School in the tournament final, earning the team's first ever sectional title in their first title game.

References

External links
Academy Charter High School

Academy Charter High School, National Center for Education Statistics

Lake Como, New Jersey
1998 establishments in New Jersey
Charter schools in New Jersey
Educational institutions established in 1998
Public high schools in Monmouth County, New Jersey